Royal Caribbean may refer to:

 Royal Caribbean International (previously Royal Caribbean Cruise Line), a cruise line brand
 Royal Caribbean Group, a cruise holding company that owns Royal Caribbean International along with several other cruise lines